Palladius of Galatia was a Christian chronicler and the bishop of Helenopolis in Bithynia. He was a devoted disciple of Saint John Chrysostom. He is best remembered for his work, the Lausiac History. He was also the author of the Dialogue on the Life of Chrysostom. Palladius is a saint in the Coptic Orthodox Church and in the Syrian Orthodox Church, wherein he is given the honorific title, The Solitary. His feast day is November 29.

Life

Early life 
Palladius was born in Galatia in 363 or 364. He dedicated himself to the monastic life in 386 or soon thereafter, residing in the Mount of Olives.

Travels 
Palladius travelled to Egypt to meet the prototypical Desert Fathers (Christian monks). In 388, he arrived in Alexandria. Around 390 he passed on to Nitria in Egypt, visiting the famous Abba Or of Nitria. A year later he travelled southwest to a district in the desert known as Cellia (also spelled Kellia).

Later life and ordination 
After his travels, his health deteriorated and he went to Palestine in search of a cooler climate. In 400 he was ordained the bishop of Helenopolis in Bithynia, and soon became involved in controversies which centred around St. John Chrysostom. In 405 he again travelled to Rome to testify that Chrysostom was not a heretic. Because of this, he was exiled by emperor Arcadius for six years in Syene, during which time he wrote his biography of St. John Chrysostom. In 412 or 413 he was restored to the episcopate, now being the bishop of Aspuna (Galatia).

His primary work was written from 419-420 and was called the Lausiac History (being composed for Lausus, chamberlain at the court of Theodosius II) which is also titled The Lives of the Friends of God. This history detailed Egyptian and Middle Eastern Christian monasticism.

Palladius died some time in the second decade of the fifth century in his jurisdiction of Aspuna.

References

External links 
 Introduction to the (public Domain) 1918 English Translation of the Lausiac History
 Greek Opera Omnia by Migne Patrologia Graeca with analytical indexes
 

Galatian people
Christian hagiographers
5th-century Byzantine bishops
360s births
420s deaths
Galatia (Roman province)
5th-century Byzantine writers
